Jay (James Clarke) Humphry (born July 28, 1948 in Vancouver, British Columbia) is a Canadian former figure skater who competed in men's singles.  He won the gold medal at the Canadian Figure Skating Championships in 1968 and 1969 and competed in the 1968 Winter Olympics.  During his competitive career he was coached by Edi Rada and Ellen Burka.

After the 1969 season, he turned professional and skated with Ice Follies, where he portrayed the role of Oscar the Grouch from Sesame Street.

As of 2009, Humphry resides in Minneapolis, Minnesota where he works for a company that produces Sesame Street-themed live entertainment shows.

Results

References

Navigation

1948 births
Living people
Canadian male single skaters
Figure skaters at the 1968 Winter Olympics
Olympic figure skaters of Canada
Figure skaters from Vancouver
Sportspeople from Minneapolis
20th-century Canadian people
21st-century Canadian people